Lippmann is a German surname. Notable people with the surname include:

 Alexandre Lippmann (1881–1960), French Olympic champion fencer
 Bernard Lippmann, American physicist, known for the Lippmann–Schwinger equation
 Edmund Oscar von Lippmann (1857–1940), German chemist 
 Frank Lippmann (born 1961), German footballer
 Horst Lippmann (1927–1997), German jazz musician
 Gabriel Lippmann (1845–1921), physicist, inventor, and Nobel laureate in physics
 Lippmann (crater), on the moon, is named after Gabriel Lippmann
 a Lippmann plate is a clear glass plate in early photography
 a Lippmann electrometer is a device for detecting small rushes of electric current, invented by Gabriel Lippmann in 1873
 Julius Lippmann (1864–1934), German liberal politician
 Karl Friedrich Lippmann (1883–1957), German painter
 Léontine Lippmann (1844–1910), French salon hostess
 Walter Lippmann (1889–1974), American writer, journalist, and political commentator
 a "lipmann" is a variety of journalist in Stranger in a Strange Land, named for Walter Lippmann 
 Colloque Walter Lippmann was a 1938 conference of intellectuals organized in Paris by philosopher Louis Rougie
 Thomas Lippmann (born 1961), German politician
Walter Max Lippmann (1919–1993), German-born Jewish community leader and advocate of multiculturalism in Australia

See also
 Lipmann
 Lippman
 Lipman
 Liebmann